In mathematics, a Hecke algebra is classically the algebra of Hecke operators studied by Erich Hecke. It may also refer to one of several algebras (some of which are related to the classical Hecke algebra):
Iwahori–Hecke algebra of a Coxeter group.
Hecke algebra of a pair (g,K) where g is the Lie algebra of a Lie group G and K is a compact subgroup of G.
Hecke algebra of a locally compact group H(G,K), for a locally compact group G with respect to a compact subgroup K.
Hecke algebra of a finite group, the algebra spanned by the double cosets HgH of a subgroup H of a finite group G.
Spherical Hecke algebra, when K is a maximal open compact subgroup of a general linear group.
Affine Hecke algebra
Parabolic Hecke algebra
Parahoric Hecke algebra

Representation theory

ja:ヘッケ環
zh-yue:Hecke 代數
zh:Hecke代數